General elections were held in Bolivia on 6 May 1951. Víctor Paz Estenssoro of the opposition Revolutionary Nationalist Movement (MNR) received the most votes in the presidential election, but as he did not obtain an absolute majority, the National Congress was constitutionally obliged to elect a President on 6 August from the three candidates who received the most public votes. However, on 16 May a military junta assumed responsibility for the Government with Brigadier General Hugo Ballivián as President.

The National Congress was ultimately dissolved by Supreme Decree of 7 June, 1951, which annulled the results of the elections.

Campaign
The Republican Socialist Unity Party (PURS) and the Social Democratic Party (PSD) formed the Social Democratic Action alliance to contest the election, with Gabriel Gosalvez of PURS running for President and Roberto Arce of the PSD running for Vice-President.

Results

President

Vice-President

Notes

References

Bibliography 
 

Elections in Bolivia
Bolivia
1951 in Bolivia
Presidential elections in Bolivia
Election and referendum articles with incomplete results
May 1951 events in South America